The Patagonian weasel (Lyncodon patagonicus) is a small mustelid that is the only member of the genus Lyncodon. Its geographic range is the Pampas of western Argentina and sections of Chile. An early mention of the animal is in the Journal of Syms Covington, who sailed with Charles Darwin on his epic voyage aboard HMS Beagle.

Description
Its fur is whitish with black and dark brown tones mixed in. It has small ears, short legs and a bushy tail. The animal has not been thoroughly studied in the wild, and knowledge of its behavioral patterns is unsure. It reportedly has been kept as a working pet by local ranchers to destroy rodents.

References

External links
 
 
 Behaviour of the Patagonian weasel

Ictonychinae
Mammals of Argentina
Mammals of Chile
Mammals of Patagonia
Mammals described in 1842